Paupisi is a comune (municipality) in the Province of Benevento in the Italian region of Campania, about  northeast of Naples and about  northwest of Benevento. As of 1 January 2020, its population was 1,629.

It borders the municipalities of Ponte, San Lorenzo Maggiore, Torrecuso and Vitulano.

Demographic evolution

References

Cities and towns in Campania